Ramcharan (sometimes Ram Charan) is a given name and surname. People with this name include:

Given name
Ram Charan, Indian actor
Ram Charan (consultant), Indian-American business consultant
Ramcharan Chaudhari (Tharu), Nepalese politician
Ram Charan Maharaj, Indian Hindu religious leader

Surname
Bertrand Ramcharan, Guyanese diplomat
Rudy Ramcharan, Canadian curler